Ab Barik (also Romanized as Āb Bārīk; also known as Āb-i-Barir) is a village in Fash Rural District, in the Central District of Kangavar County, Kermanshah Province, Iran. At the 2006 census, its population was 160, in 43 families.

References 

Populated places in Kangavar County